Hugo McCloud (born 1980) is an American visual artist born in Palo Alto, California. He is inspired by urban landscapes and using unconventional, mostly industrial and discarded, materials to create his pieces, such as: black tar, bitumen, aluminum sheeting, oxidized steel plates, and plastic bags. He fuses these materials with conventional pigment and woodblock printing techniques. McCloud gets his references from photographs of people in developing countries. Using these photographs his work relates on topics like economy of labor, geopolitics, and environmental issues. His works states what reversing the negative impact of society's carbon footprint could look like.

Career
McCloud moved to New York in 2009 and moved to Mexico in 2020 to live between Mexico and the United States. His work with the plastic bags started after he saw a show in Mumbai in 2015 where they had stacks of colorful plastic bags; after experiencing that, he decided to collect plastic bags from the many places he travelled to, experimenting with the possibilities plastic can be used in art.

He is a designer and fabricator who did not go to a traditional art school. He did a residency in the Philippines on how to make stamps and carving blocks. He had the option to send in his designs and have a manufacturer make them in this process, but McCloud wanted to partake in the manual labor and the repetition of the stamp and carving blocks process rather than just have someone else make it from his designs.

Hugo McCloud currently lives and works in Brooklyn, New York, and Tulum, Mexico. His early work used unconventional materials like roofing metal as a canvas, and was inspired by images the artist would find on Instagram. He has explained that when looking at these images, he is “drawn to [them] either because of the composition or colors or subject matter.” Using these materials, McCloud's more abstract works still connect to conversations about social class and cultural reflections of his experiences. His latest work was inspired by his experience moving to Mexico in 2018; utilizing single-use plastic bags, McCloud depicts scenes of workers and the homeless.

Major works

Tulum (2014)
This piece is made on tar paper and resembles the qualities of a painterly work, when in reality it contains very little paint material. This piece is part of a series started in 2012 when McCloud was residing in New York.

Burdened (2020)
Burdened is the exhibition at the Sean Kelly Gallery in New York where Hugo McCloud debut and got recognized for his pieces made out of plastic bags. His work in this exhibition is divided into three sections: “one focused on workers involved in the labor of carrying goods on their backs, carts or bicycles; another capturing refugees on boats in the Mediterranean sea; and a final one capturing flowers McCloud photographed in his studio in Tulum during the months he was quarantined due to the COVID-19 pandemic.” He was inspired by his trip to Mumbai, where he saw all the colorful plastic bags stacked together to travel around the world, collect plastic bags, and to talk to people to know about their experiences.

The day before friday the 12th (2020) 
This piece was shown at the Burdened Exhibition in the Sean Kelley Gallery in New York. It was part of his series of paintings that were made with colorful plastic bags. It is based on a photograph of refugees from Libya in a canoe that is filled with bodies crossing the Mediterranean. This piece is meant to discuss a social justice issue and showcase a tragedy that can create a sense of activism and empathy in the viewer.

the burden of man: waiting to breathe (2021)
This piece “is directly responding to the pandemic and other current issues happening simultaneously such as migration; the oxygen tanks are relating to the shortages in many impoverished areas,” McCloud says. It is a large painting that has oxygen tanks all across the lower half of the piece. Overlaid and mostly on the upper part of the piece are palm trees and a map. The map is of migration paths, referencing the conflicts about the incomplete border wall between Mexico and the United States.

Solo exhibitions 

 2015 Fondazione 107, Turin, Italy
 2015 The Arts Club, London, England
 2018 Sean Kelly Gallery, New York
 2021 Aldrich Contemporary Art Museum, Ridgefield, Connecticut
 2021 Sean Kelly Gallery, New York
 2015 The Arts Club, London, England
 2018 Sean Kelly Gallery, New York
 2021 Aldrich Contemporary Art Museum, Ridgefield, Connecticut
 2021 Sean Kelly Gallery, New York

Group exhibitions
2015 Studio Museum in Harlem, New Work
2020 The Drawing Center, New York
2015 Sean Kelly Gallery, New York
2021 Brooklyn Museum, Brooklyn, New York
2021 Nasher Museum of Art, New York

Collections
National Museum of African American History and Culture in Washington, D.C. 
North Carolina Museum of Art
Detroit Institute of Arts
Margulies collection at the Warehouse
Nasher Museum of Art at Duke University
Brooklyn Museum
The Mott Warsh Collection 
The Joyner/Giuffrida Collection

References

1980 births
Living people
Artists from California
Postmodern artists
American artists
21st-century American artists